The New Men (French: Les Hommes nouveaux) is a 1936 French drama film written and directed by Marcel L'Herbier and starring Harry Baur, Natalie Paley and Gabriel Signoret. The film was based on the novel of the same title by Claude Farrère, which had previously been adapted into a 1922 silent film.  The film's sets were designed by the art director Robert Gys.

Synopsis
In the early decades of the twentieth century, a group of adventurers are encouraged to settle the southern area of French Morocco. The plot follows the rise of one of these "new men" Bourron, a former docker.

Cast 
 Harry Baur as Bourron
 Natalie Paley as Christiane 
 Gabriel Signoret as Maréchal Lyautey de Tolly
 Max Michel as Henri de Chassagnes
 Claude Sainval as Jean de Sainte-Foy
 Sylvio De Pedrelli as Medhani, the gangster boss
 Jean Marais as the clerk
 André Numès Fils as Roussignol
 René Bergeron as Mingasse
 Marie-Jacqueline Chantal as the nurse
 Gustave Gallet as Clémenceau
 Ben Gassin as Zerfatti
 André Carnège as the commander
 Hugues de Bagratide as an officier
 Paul Amiot as D'Amade

References

Bibliography
 Andrew, Dudley & Ungar, Steven. Popular Front Paris and the Poetics of Culture. Harvard University Press, 2005.
 Goble, Alan. The Complete Index to Literary Sources in Film. Walter de Gruyter, 1999.

External links 
 
 Les Hommes nouveaux (1936) at the ''Films de France'

1936 films
French drama films
1930s French-language films
French black-and-white films
Films directed by Marcel L'Herbier
1936 drama films
1930s French films
Films based on French novels
Films set in Morocco
Remakes of French films